Cop Road is a proposed tram stop on the Oldham and Rochdale Line of Greater Manchester's Metrolink light rail system.

Background
The proposal is identified in the Greater Manchester Spatial Framework.

References

Proposed Manchester Metrolink tram stops